Bogdan Sadovskiy (born 1 August 1999) is a Belarusian professional footballer.

References

External links 
 
 

1999 births
Living people
Belarusian footballers
Association football forwards
FC Slavia Mozyr players
FC Dynamo Brest players
FC Energetik-BGU Minsk players
FC Smorgon players
FC Rukh Brest players